Bojan Krivec (born 14 May 1987) is a Slovenian professional basketball player who currently plays for the KK Žoltasti Troti in the 2. Slovenian League. He is 188 cm tall and plays the point guard position.

References

External links
 Bojan Krivec profile at FIBA

1987 births
Living people
Slovenian men's basketball players
Sportspeople from Novo Mesto
ABA League players
KK Krka players
Point guards
KK Kvarner 2010 players